Robert Neilson (17 November 1874 – 16 July 1946) was a Scotland international rugby union player.

Rugby Union career

Amateur career

He also played for West of Scotland FC.

Provincial career

He was capped for Glasgow District in 1898.

International career

Administrative career

He was President of the Scottish Rugby Union for the period 1923 to 1924.

Family

His father was James Neilson, an Ironmaster and second cousin of Walter Montgomerie Neilson and his mother was Jane Thomson, daughter of George Thomson, the famous Glasgow shipbuilder. He attended Merchiston Castle School.

He was the brother of George, Gordon and Willie Neilson who were also capped for Scotland. In 1891, he made his debut, along with his brother George in the game against  – it is the only time that brothers have debuted together for Scotland, with the exception of the joint debut of Gavin and Scott Hastings. One of the four Neilson brothers played in each of the twenty five matches between Willie and George's debut in 1891, until 1899, when Robert had to withdraw from the Calcutta Cup line-up after breaking his nose. Robert played another match in 1900.

Along with his brothers, Willie and George, he was a president of the Scottish Rugby Union.

References

Sources

 Bath, Richard (ed.) The Scotland Rugby Miscellany (Vision Sports Publishing Ltd, 2007 )
 Thorburn, Sandy The History of Scottish Rugby

1870s births
1946 deaths
People educated at Merchiston Castle School
Scottish rugby union players
Scotland international rugby union players
Robert
West of Scotland FC players
Glasgow District (rugby union) players
Presidents of the Scottish Rugby Union
Rugby union players from South Lanarkshire